Guderup is a town located on the island of Als in south Denmark, in Sønderborg Municipality.

References 

Cities and towns in the Region of Southern Denmark
Sønderborg Municipality
Als (island)